The 1991 Players Championship was a golf tournament in Florida on the PGA Tour, held  at TPC Sawgrass in Ponte Vedra Beach, southeast of Jacksonville. It was the eighteenth Players Championship. 

Steve Elkington birdied the final hole to win the title at 276 (−12), one stroke ahead of runner-up Fuzzy Zoeller. Elkington won a second Players six years later in 1997.

Defending champion Jodie Mudd missed the 36-hole cut by five strokes.

Venue

Eligibility requirements 
1. The top 125 PGA Tour members from the Final 1990 Official Money List:

John Adams, Fulton Allem, Billy Andrade, Tommy Armour III, Paul Azinger, Ian Baker-Finch, Dave Barr, Andy Bean, Chip Beck, Phil Blackmar, Jay Don Blake, Jim Booros, Bill Britton, Mark Brooks, Billy Ray Brown, Brad Bryant, Tom Byrum, Mark Calcavecchia, David Canipe, Brian Claar, Keith Clearwater, Russ Cochran, John Cook, Fred Couples, Ben Crenshaw, Jay Delsing, Mike Donald, Ed Dougherty, Bob Eastwood, David Edwards, Steve Elkington, Bob Estes, Brad Fabel, Brad Faxon, Rick Fehr, Dan Forsman, David Frost, Fred Funk, Jim Gallagher Jr., Robert Gamez, Buddy Gardner, Bob Gilder, Bill Glasson, Wayne Grady, Ken Green, Jay Haas, Gary Hallberg, Jim Hallet, Donnie Hammond, Morris Hatalsky, Nolan Henke, Scott Hoch, Mike Hulbert, John Huston, Hale Irwin, Peter Jacobsen, Lee Janzen, Steve Jones, Tom Kite, Kenny Knox, Wayne Levi, Bruce Lietzke, Bob Lohr, Davis Love III, Mark Lye, Andrew Magee, John Mahaffey, Billy Mayfair, Blaine McCallister, Mark McCumber, Rocco Mediate, Larry Mize , Gil Morgan, Jodie Mudd, Larry Nelson, Greg Norman, Mark O'Meara, Steve Pate, Corey Pavin, David Peoples, Chris Perry, Kenny Perry, Peter Persons, Don Pooley, Nick Price, Tom Purtzer, Larry Rinker, Loren Roberts, Bill Sander, Gene Sauers, Ted Schulz, Tom Sieckmann, Tim Simpson, Joey Sindelar, Mike Smith, Craig Stadler, Ray Stewart, Curtis Strange, Hal Sutton, Brian Tennyson, Doug Tewell, Jim Thorpe, Kirk Triplett, Bob Tway, Howard Twitty, Stan Utley, Scott Verplank, Bobby Wadkins, Lanny Wadkins, Tom Watson, D. A. Weibring, Mark Wiebe, Bob Wolcott, Willie Wood, Jim Woodward, Robert Wrenn, Fuzzy Zoeller, Richard Zokol

Emlyn Aubrey, Payne Stewart, Raymond Floyd, Mike Reid, Tony Sills, Scott Simpson, and Jeff Sluman elected not to play

Source:

2. Designated players:

3. Any foreign player meeting the requirements of a designated player, whether or not he is a PGA Tour member:

Sandy Lyle, Ian Woosnam, Nick Faldo, José María Olazábal

4. Winners in the last 10 calendar years of The Players Championship, Masters Tournament, U.S. Open, PGA Championship, and World Series of Golf:

David Graham, Jerry Pate, Seve Ballesteros, Calvin Peete, Bernhard Langer Andy North, Hubert Green, Roger Maltbie

5. British Open winners since 1990:

6. Six players, not otherwise eligible, designated by The Players Championship Committee as "special selections":

Mark Hayes, Masashi Ozaki, Peter Senior, Craig Parry, Denis Watson, Mark McNulty

7. To complete a field of 144 players, those players in order, not otherwise eligible, from the 1991 Official Money List, as of the completion of the USF&G Classic:

Dan Halldorson, Dave Rummells, Bart Bryant, John Daly, Jeff Maggert, Neal Lancaster, Dan Pohl

Source:

General Source:

Round summaries

First round
Thursday, March 28, 1991

Source:

Second round
Friday, March 29, 1991

Source:

Third round
Saturday, March 30, 1991

Source:

Final round
Sunday, March 31, 1991

References

External links
The Players Championship website

1991
1991 in golf
1991 in American sports
1991 in sports in Florida
March 1991 sports events in the United States